Independent Truck Company is a skateboard truck manufacturer based in Santa Cruz, California. Established in 1978, the company is owned by NHS, Inc. and sponsors an extensive list of team riders.

History
The company was co-founded by Richard Novak, Jay Shiurman, Fausto Vitello, and Eric Swenson and the Stage 1 model was the inaugural product, released on May 23, 1978, in Newark, California. The Independent truck (or "Indy") was designed as a response to the lack of quality skateboard trucks on the market at the time. In reference to the two other major truck companies on the market, Blackhart stated that one broke, and one didn’t turn (Bennett Trucks and Tracker Trucks, respectively).

Independent trucks are manufactured with:
high quality aircraft grade T6 aluminum alloy
high tensile SAE 4130 Chromoly alloy steel axles
high rebound formula stock bushings.

Product releases
Stage 1 - 1978
Stage 2 - 1979
Stage 3 - 1982
Stage 4 - 1984
Stage 5 - 1986
Stage 6 - 1991
Stage 7 - 1993
Stage 8 - 1997
Stage 9 - 2003
Stage 10 - 2009
Stage 11 - 2012

Logo
The logo for the trucks was based on the Iron Cross according to the author, Jim Phillips. It has remained the Independent logo since the company's inception and was derived from the French variation of the Cross pattée.

Jim Phillips says in his 2007 book "The Art of Jim Phillips":

In 2021, after many vocalized opinions that the cross was indeed too "Nazi-like", the main logo was changed and they now only occasionally use the iron cross logo.

References

External links 

Skateboarding companies
1978 establishments in the United States